Clardy is a surname. People with this surname include:

 H. Stacy Clardy (born 1960), American soldier
 Jon Clardy (born 1943), American scientist
 John Daniel Clardy (1828-1918), American politician
 Josephine Clardy Fox (1881-1970), American businesswoman and philanthropist
 Kit Clardy (1892-1961), American politician
 Martin L. Clardy (1844-1914), American politician
 Travis Clardy (born 1962), American attorney